Eucalyptus deglupta is a species of tall tree, commonly known as the rainbow eucalyptus, Mindanao gum, or rainbow gum that is native to the Philippines, Indonesia, and Papua New Guinea. It is the only Eucalyptus species that usually lives in rainforest, with a natural range that extends into the northern hemisphere. It is characterized by multi-colored bark.

Description

It has smooth, orange-tinted bark that sheds in strips, revealing streaks of pale green, red, orange, grey, and purplish brown. The branchlets are roughly square in cross section, often with narrow wings on the corners. Flowering time depends on location, and the stamens that give the flowers their colour are white and pale yellow. Each cell of the fruit contains between three and twelve minute brown seeds, each with a small wing.

Taxonomy and naming
Eucalyptus deglupta was first formally described in 1850 by Carl Ludwig Blume who published the description in his book Museum Botanicum Lugduno-Batavum sive stirpium Exoticarum, Novarum vel Minus Cognitarum ex Vivis aut Siccis Brevis Expositio et Descriptio from material collected in mountain forests in the Celebes. The specific epithet (deglupta) is a Latin word meaning "peeled off, husked or shelled".

In 1914, Adolph Daniel Edward Elmer described Eugenia binacag in Leaflets of Philippine Botany, the specific epithet binacag a local name for the tree, but in 1915 changed the name to Eucalyptus binacag. However, the species had already been named E. deglupta by Blume in 1850 and E. binacag is now regarded as a synonym.

In 1854, Asa Gray described Eucalyptus multiflora in United States Exploring Expedition - Botany, Phanerogamia from an unpublished description by Louis Claude Richard, but is a nomen illegitimum because the name was already in use for a different species (Eucalyptus multiflora Poir.) now known as Eucalyptus robusta. Eucalyptus multiflora is also a synonym of E. deglupta.

Eucalyptus sarassa and E. versicolor, first described in 1850 by Blume in his book Museum botanicum Lugduno-Batavum, and E. schlechteri first described by Ludwig Diels in Adolf Engler's book Botanische Jahrbücher für Systematik, Pflanzengeschichte und Pflanzengeographie are also considered to be synonyms of E. deglupta by Plants of the World Online.

Distribution and habitat
It is native to Indonesia, Papua New Guinea, and the Philippines, but has been widely planted in many other countries.

Uses

Pulpwood
This tree is grown widely around the world in tree plantations, mainly for pulpwood used in making white paper. It is the dominant species used for pulpwood plantations in the Philippines.

Use in horticulture
E. deglupta are commonly planted as ornamental trees in frost-free climates such as Hawaii, Southern California, Texas and Florida. It is planted in at least three locations in coastal Los Angeles County, including Santa Monica and San Marino at the Huntington Botanical Garden. These trees were still growing, but relatively young at approximately 30–40 years in 1988, at the UCLA Botanic Garden and as a LA City street tree.

Plants can be grown from cuttings of trees younger than 5 years old. Once a tree reaches 5 years of age, root inhibition prevents the generation of roots from cuttings. It thrives in rich medium-to-wet soil in full sun and is intolerant of frost. In botanical gardens such as Fairchild Tropical Botanic Garden in Florida, the tree does show the intense color range as seen in the tree's normal range.

References

External links

deglupta
Trees of the Philippines
Trees of New Guinea
Trees of the Maluku Islands
Trees of Sulawesi
Flora of the Bismarck Archipelago
Garden plants of Asia
Ornamental trees
Taxa named by Carl Ludwig Blume
Plants described in 1850